Le Port is a commune in the French overseas department of Réunion. It is located at the extreme northwest corner of the island of Réunion. It has a population of 34,218 (2017). It is the main harbor city of the island.

Climate

Le Port features a hot semi-arid climate (Köppen BSh). Due to located leeward side of the island, Le Port does not receive as much precipitation as Saint-Denis and the eastern part of the island. There is a wetter season from December to April and a drier season for the rest of the year. February is also the wettest month, receiving  of rain on average. July is also the driest month, receiving only  of rainfall on average. Le Port receives 2670.6 hours of sunshine annually, which is evenly distributed throughout the year. February is the least sunny and July is sunniest, although all months receive between 205 and 232 hours of sunshine on average.

Population

International relations

Le Port is twinned with:
 Durban, South Africa
 Toamasina, Madagascar
 Port Louis, Mauritius
 Quelimane, Mozambique

Politics and media
This is the town where the Communist Party of Réunion usually gets most of their votes. Also, the newspaper of the party, Temoignages, has headquarters in Le Port.

See also
 Communes of the Réunion department

References

External links

Official website (in French)
 Port Louis, Port Réunion, Port Toamasina. Thesis by Claude Lagier, PhD. (IOCL), 2009.

Communes of Réunion